Ulsan Industrial Center Monument, widely known as Gongeoptap (Industrial Tower), is a monumental tower located in Gongeoptap Rotary, Namgu, Ulsan.

History

2010 monument globe rust issue

Epigraphy 
There are 4 epigraphs around the tower: 2 of them are written by dictator and then chairman of Supreme Council for National Reconstruction Park Chung-hee in 1962 and one is written by the monument construct committee in 1967, while the other is written by the city government in 2012.

Congratulatory Note On the Groundbreaking Ceremony For Ulsan Industrial Center

Declaration Of the Designation Of Ulsan Industrial District

Note On the Purpose Of Constructing the Monument

Second Declaration For the Leap Of Ulsan

Gongeoptap Rotary 
Gongeoptap Rotary (Industrial Tower Rotary Intersection) is a traffic circle that the monument is located. Like the monument's number of pillars, it contains 5 exits (from North and counterclockwise Bongwol-ro, Munsu-ro, Duwang-ro, Suam-ro, Samsan-ro) and is egg-like asymmetric because of this. As it is the most 'rushing' intersection in Ulsan, the rotary has been functioning as de facto bus transfer center, which is in fact not available in the city yet.

List of bus stops named after Gongeoptap 
There are 4 city bus stops and 2 intercity bus stops which use 'Gongeoptap' name around the rotary, listed in Bus Information System. The stops are:
 Samsan-ro
 공업탑 (BIS No. 40401, Google Maps) - East bound, incorrectly informed as 'route to Taehwagang station' but actually buses do not go straight through.
 공업탑 (BIS No. 40403, Google Maps) - East bound, no description but the actual bus stop for buses route to Taehwagang station.
 공업탑 (BIS No. 40402, Google Maps) - West bound, informed as 'route to Gongeoptop' and in reality buses turn the rotary.
 공업탑 (BIS No. 40404, Google Maps) - West bound, no description but for buses that go directly Bongwol-ro or Munsu-ro.
 공업탑 (Google Maps): East bound, intercity/Express unload only.
 Munsu-ro
 공업탑 시외정류소 (Google Maps): West bound, intercity load only; there was a city bus stop with the same name and location but removed in 2015.

References 

Monuments and memorials in South Korea
Roundabouts and traffic circles